Delhi Public School (DPS), Chandigarh is a private secondary school in Chandigarh, India. It was established in 2003. It is part of a chain of schools administered by Delhi Public School Society. The school offers 14 years of schooling and is affiliated to Central Board of Secondary Education.

Facilities
The school offers several facilities:

 Several computer labs
 A big library
 Dance and music rooms
 AV room
 Seminar room
 A canteen
 Physics, Chemistry and Biology labs
 Language lab
 Maths lab
 Smart classrooms  
Spacious auditorium
Amphitheatre

Delhi Public School, Mohali 
Delhi Public School, Mohali is a Link School with DPS Chandigarh under the aegis of Delhi Public School, Chandigarh. It is also affiliated to CBSE.

See also 
 Delhi Public School Society
 Central Board of Secondary Education

References

External links 
 
 School Information

Delhi Public School Society
Schools in Chandigarh
Educational institutions established in 2003
2003 establishments in Chandigarh